James Hiroyuki Liao (born February 6, 1976) is an American actor. Liao is known for his television roles as Roland Glenn in the Fox serial drama Prison Break (2008); Jay Lee in the CBS, and later A&E, police procedural series Unforgettable (2013–2016); and Albert Nguyen in the HBO black comedy series Barry (2019–present). 

Liao provided voice acting and motion-capture acting for the role of Kenji in the video game Ghost of Tsushima (2020).

Biography 
Liao was born on February 6, 1976, in Bensonhurst, Brooklyn. His father is Taiwanese and his mother is Japanese. He was a graduate student from the Juilliard School's drama division, finishing in 2004 and also studied at the Marjorie Ballentine Studio, where he befriended Amaury Nolasco.

Liao played Roland Glenn in season four of Prison Break, and starred in other television roles, such as 24, CSI: Crime Scene Investigation, Bones, CSI: Miami and Law & Order. His stage work includes playing Song Liling (Butterfly) in Washington DC's Arena Stage production of M. Butterfly. He also starred with Jennifer Aniston in Management. Liao and Nolasco starred in the fourth season of Prison Break.

Filmography

Film

Television

Direct to Video

Video Games

References

External links
 

American male film actors
American male stage actors
American male television actors
American male actors of Taiwanese descent
American film actors of Asian descent
Juilliard School alumni
Living people
Male actors from New York City
American male actors of Japanese descent
People from Bensonhurst, Brooklyn
21st-century American male actors
1985 births